William Franklin Talbert (September 4, 1918 – February 28, 1999) was an American tennis player and administrator.

Tennis career
He was ranked in the U.S. top 10 13 times between 1941 and 1954, and was ranked World No. 3 in 1949 by John Olliff of The Daily Telegraph. He won nine Grand Slam doubles titles, and also reached the men's doubles finals of the U.S. National Championship nine times, mainly with Gardnar Mulloy, his favorite partner. He also was a Davis Cup player and one of the more successful Davis Cup captains in U.S. history.

Talbert was a Type 1 diabetic, one of the few known to be in sports at a highly competitive level, and for many years was held up as an example of how this disease could be surmounted.

Born in Cincinnati, Ohio, Talbert still holds records at the Cincinnati Masters in his hometown. His records are for most doubles titles (six), most total finals appearances (14), and most singles finals appearances (seven). He won three singles titles (in 1943, 1945 and 1947), and his six doubles titles came in 1943, 1944, 1945, 1947, 1951 and 1954.

Talbert reached the final of the U.S. Championships in 1944 and 1945 (losing both finals to Frank Parker). He also reached the semifinals of the French championships in 1950, losing to Budge Patty 13–11 in the fifth set).

Talbert also won the singles title at the U.S. Clay Court Championship in 1945 and was a finalist in 1946 and 1943. Before starting on the international tour, he played for the University of Cincinnati and won an Ohio State singles title in 1936 while at Cincinnati's Hughes High School.

Talbert was enshrined into the International Tennis Hall of Fame in 1967 and was in the first class, along with his former protégé Tony Trabert, enshrined into the Cincinnati Tennis Hall of Fame in 2002. After his playing career, he wrote tennis books, including the best seller The Game of Doubles in Tennis with Bruce Old in 1977, served as a tennis commentator for NBC Sports, and was the tournament director of the US Open.

Grand Slam finals

Singles (2 runners-up)

Doubles (5 titles, 5 runners-up)

Mixed Doubles (4 titles, 3 runners-up)

References

External links
 
 
 
 

American male tennis players
United States National champions (tennis)
French Championships (tennis) champions
International Tennis Hall of Fame inductees
Tennis commentators
Tennis people from Ohio
American color commentators
Tennis players from Cincinnati
1918 births
1999 deaths
Grand Slam (tennis) champions in mixed doubles
Grand Slam (tennis) champions in men's doubles
People with type 1 diabetes